Christopher Thorpe (born October 29, 1970 in Waukegan, Illinois) is an American luger who competed from 1989 to 2002. Competing in four Winter Olympics, he won two medals in the men's doubles event with a silver in 1998 and a bronze in 2002.

Thorpe also won two silver medals in the men's doubles event at the FIL World Luge Championships, earning them in 1995 and 1996. He won the overall Luge World Cup men's doubles title in 1996–7.

While living in Marquette, Michigan, Thorpe, along with fellow Boy Scout and future World Champion Wendel Suckow, first experienced luge on a small local track that (after being relocated to nearby Negaunee, Michigan) remains the only full-length natural track luge facility in the United States.

Thorpe is a 1988 graduate of Marquette Senior High School.

Thorpe retired from luge after the 2002 Winter Olympics and is a now retired living in Farmington, New Mexico.

References

 1994 luge men's doubles results
 
 
 FIL-Luge profile

External links 
 
 
 

1970 births
American male lugers
Living people
Lugers at the 1992 Winter Olympics
Lugers at the 1994 Winter Olympics
Lugers at the 1998 Winter Olympics
Lugers at the 2002 Winter Olympics
People from Florida
Sportspeople from Waukegan, Illinois
Sportspeople from Michigan
Olympic lugers of the United States
Medalists at the 2002 Winter Olympics
Medalists at the 1998 Winter Olympics
Olympic silver medalists for the United States in luge
Olympic bronze medalists for the United States in luge
People from Farmington, New Mexico